Pino Amenta is an Australian director best known for his work in television.

Selected credits

Film

Television 
The numbers in directing credits refer to the number of episodes.

Personal life
He is the father of actress Jade Amenta.

References

External links

Pino Amenta at AustLit (subscription required)

Australian directors
Living people
Year of birth missing (living people)